Lutz Altepost (born October 6, 1981 in Emsdetten, North Rhine-Westphalia) is a German sprint canoeist who has competed since the late 1990s. Competing in two Summer Olympics, he won a bronze medal in the K-4 1000 m event at Beijing in 2008.

At the 1999 Junior World Championships in Zagreb, Croatia, he won two gold medals with Germany's four-man K-4 crew (K-4 500 m and K-4 1000 m).

As a senior, he has established himself among the elite K-1 500 m paddlers in international competitions but has yet to win an individual gold medal. In 2002 he finished sixteenth at the Seville world championships. The following year in Gainesville, USA, he took the bronze medal. At the Athens Olympics in 2004 he came seventh. At the 2005 ICF Canoe Sprint World Championships he won the silver medal.

After the Athens Olympics Altepost was chosen to lead Germany's revamped K4 boat. In their debut season together the new four won the K-4 1000 m world championship final in Zagreb ahead of reigning champions Slovakia giving Altepost his first gold medal as a senior.

In 2006 Altepost enjoyed mixed fortunes at the 2006 World Championships. In the individual K-1 500 m he achieved a medal placing for the third consecutive year, this time winning the bronze medal. In the team kayak events however Altepost's K-4 crew were unable to repeat their Zagreb success and surprisingly failed to make the podium in any of the three race distances though they did win the K-4 1000 m event at the 2007 championships.

He is 193 cm (6'4") tall and weighs 95 kg (209 lbs).

References
 

1981 births
Living people
People from Emsdetten
Sportspeople from Münster (region)
Canoeists at the 2004 Summer Olympics
Canoeists at the 2008 Summer Olympics
German male canoeists
Olympic canoeists of Germany
Olympic bronze medalists for Germany
Olympic medalists in canoeing
ICF Canoe Sprint World Championships medalists in kayak
Medalists at the 2008 Summer Olympics